Munia (The Tale) (also stylized as Munia: The Tale) is the third studio album by Cameroonian jazz bassist and musician Richard Bona. It was released on September 22, 2003 through Universal Music France.

Track listing

Chart performance

References

Richard Bona albums
2003 albums